The Convention on Environmental Impact Assessment in a Transboundary Context (informally called the Espoo Convention) is a United Nations Economic Commission for Europe (UNECE) convention signed in Espoo, Finland, in 1991 that entered into force in 1997. The Convention sets out the obligations of Parties—that is States that have agreed to be bound by the Convention—to carry out an environmental impact assessment of certain activities at an early stage of planning. It also lays down the general obligation of States to notify and consult each other on all major projects under consideration that are likely to have a significant adverse environmental impact across boundaries.

As of April 2014, the treaty had been ratified by 44 states and the European Union.

Amendments 
The Convention has been amended twice. 
The first amendment was adopted in Sofia in 2001; it has entered into force 26 August 2014. It opens the Convention to accession upon approval by United Nations Member States that are not members of the UNECE. 
The second amendment was adopted in Cavtat, Croatia, in 2004; as for the September 2016, it is not in force yet. Once in force it will: allow, as appropriate, affected Parties to participate in scoping; require reviews of compliance; revise the Convention's Appendix I (list of activities); and make other minor changes.

Procedure 
The Convention involves a Party (or Parties) of origin (States where an activity is planned) and an affected Party (or Parties) (States whose territory may be significantly adversely affected by the activity). The Convention's main procedural steps are:

 application of the Convention by the Party of origin (Art. 2.2, 2.5/App. I+III)
 notification of the affected Party by the Party of origin (Art. 3.1)
 confirmation of participation by the affected Party (Art. 3.3)
 transmittal of information from the affected Party to the Party of origin (Art. 3.6)
 public participation in the affected Party (Art. 3.8)
 preparation of EIA documentation (Art. 4/App. II)
 distribution of the EIA documentation for the purpose of participation of authorities and public of the affected Party (Art. 4.2)
 consultation between the concerned Parties (Art. 5)
 final decision by the Party of origin (Art. 6.1)
 transmittal of final decision documentation to the affected Party (Art. 6.2)
 post-project analysis (Art. 7.1/App. V)

Inquiry commissions 

Article 3(7) of the Convention offers a procedure by which parties can solve differences by scientific, non-judicial means. The first case in which an inquiry commission was established under article 3(7) was that of the Bystroe Canal, at the request of Romania in 2004.

A case which involved countries far apart on the globe was raised by Micronesia, which claimed that the Czech coal-fired plant at Prunerov was significantly affecting its climate due to global warming.

Related issues 
The Convention was also instrumental in the creation of Strategic Environmental Assessment and has been supplemented by a Protocol on Strategic Environmental Assessment.

See also
Environmental issues

References

External links
Convention on Environmental Impact Assessment in a Transboundary Context
Signatures and ratifications , at depositary

United Nations Economic Commission for Europe treaties
Transboundary
Treaties concluded in 1991
Treaties entered into force in 1997
1997 in the environment
Transboundary Convention
Treaties of Albania
Treaties of Armenia
Treaties of Austria
Treaties of Azerbaijan
Treaties of Belarus
Treaties of Belgium
Treaties of Bosnia and Herzegovina
Treaties of Bulgaria
Treaties of Canada
Treaties of Croatia
Treaties of Cyprus
Treaties of the Czech Republic
Treaties of Czechoslovakia
Treaties of Denmark
Treaties of Estonia
Treaties entered into by the European Union
Treaties of Finland
Treaties of France
Treaties of Germany
Treaties of Greece
Treaties of Hungary
Treaties of Ireland
Treaties of Italy
Treaties of Kazakhstan
Treaties of Kyrgyzstan
Treaties of Latvia
Treaties of Liechtenstein
Treaties of Lithuania
Treaties of Luxembourg
Treaties of Malta
Treaties of Montenegro
Treaties of the Netherlands
Treaties of Norway
Treaties of Poland
Treaties of Portugal
Treaties of Moldova
Treaties of Romania
Treaties of Serbia
Treaties of Slovakia
Treaties of Slovenia
Treaties of Spain
Treaties of Sweden
Treaties of Switzerland
Treaties of North Macedonia
Treaties of Ukraine
Treaties of the United Kingdom
1991 in Finland
Treaties extended to the Faroe Islands
Treaties extended to Greenland
Treaties extended to Guernsey
Treaties extended to Jersey
Treaties extended to the Isle of Man
Treaties extended to Gibraltar
Transboundary environmental issues